Thomas Jefferson Academy is a private school in Louisville, Georgia, United States.  It offers education for students in K3 through twelfth grade.  Thomas Jefferson Academy is a member of Georgia Independent School Association (GISA).

Admission is by application and requires an entrance exam.

Thomas Jefferson Academy let the student body vote on a mascot.  The students selected a jaguar, a native South American cat.

History 
Grades one through five were housed at the former Stapleton Academy building and grades six through twelve attended classes at the former Bartow Academy.

Athletics and extra-curricular activities 
Thomas Jefferson Academy offers many different sports throughout the year, with an equal number for girls and boys.  These include football, basketball, baseball, golf, softball, and track.

Class GISA Champions 

Thomas Jefferson Academy also offers Jr. Beta Club, Beta Club, Yearbook Staff, FCA (Fellowship of Christian Athletes), Drama Club, Key Club, and literary competition.

References

External links 
 Thomas Jefferson Academy

Schools in Jefferson County, Georgia
Private high schools in Georgia (U.S. state)
Private middle schools in Georgia (U.S. state)
Private elementary schools in Georgia (U.S. state)
Preparatory schools in Georgia (U.S. state)